The Directorate General of Nature Resources and Ecosystem Conservation (Indonesian: Direktorat Jenderal Konservasi Sumber Daya Alam dan Ekosistem, also known as Ditjen KSDAE) is a directorate general under the Ministry of Environment and Forestry of the Republic of Indonesia.  Its tasks and functions include planning and implementation of policy in the field of forest protection and nature conservation, including forest protection, forest fire, protected area conservation, wild plants and animals conservation, and natural  recreation and environment.  This conservation scheme was designed to benefit those local communities which neighbour Indonesian forestry and to help the most endangered species living in these threatened habitats.

Prior to 2015, it was named Directorate General of Forest Protection and Nature Conservation (Direktorat Jenderal Perlindungan Hutan dan Konservasi Alam - PHKA). Its current name was taken into effect due to the merger of Ministry of Environment and Ministry of Forestry in 2014.

External links 
 The Ministry of Forestry (Indonesia)
 History of the Directorate General

Government agencies of Indonesia
Indonesia
Forestry in Indonesia